Solange Pauline Eugénie d'Herbez de la Tour (born 8 September 1924) is a Romanian-born French architect.

Life
She was born in 1924 to Albert and Juliette d'Herbez de la Tour in Bucharest, Romania. She received her Bachelor of Architecture degree from the University of Bucharest and then earned a degree in urban planning from the Polytechnical School of Bucharest. Herbez de la Tour moved to Paris, and opened her own architecture firm there. In Paris, she designed over 5,000 apartment units, public and cultural buildings, sports buildings, day nurseries, hospitals, elementary schools, and planning for new towns. She is the founder of the Union internationale des femmes architectes (English: International Union of Women Architects). She lives in Paris.

Notable awards

Chevalier, National Order of Merit, 1965
Officer, Legion of Honour, 1981
American Institute of Architects Honorary Fellowship, 1986

References

1924 births
Living people
20th-century French architects
Knights of the Ordre national du Mérite
French urban planners
Women urban planners
Officiers of the Légion d'honneur
Architects from Bucharest
Politehnica University of Bucharest alumni
University of Bucharest alumni
French women architects
Romanian emigrants to France
20th-century French women